Ghulam Dastagir is a male Muslim given name. It may refer to

Ghulam Dastagir Shaida (1916–1970), Afghan singer and musician
Quazi Golam Dastgir (1932–2008), Bangladesh army officer and diplomat
Ghulam Dastagir Alam (born 1933), Pakistani theoretical physicist
Ghulam Dastagir Panjsheri (born 1933), Afghan politician
Ghulam Dastagir (wrestler) (born 1945), Afghan wrestler
Ghulam Dastagir Azad, Afghan politician
Ghulam Dastagir (died 2003), Indian railway official who saved many lives in Bhopal disaster on 3 December 1984